Quintus Aelius Tubero ( mid-1st century BC) was a Roman jurist and historian.

Biography

Early life
Quintus is presumed to have been the son of Lucius Aelius Tubero and Tullia, a cousin of the orator Cicero.

Career
He fought for Pompey at the Battle of Pharsalus in 48 BC, but was subsequently pardoned by Julius Caesar. In 46 BC, Tubero unsuccessfully attempted to prosecute one of Caesar's opponents, Quintus Ligarius, whose defence was undertaken by Cicero. This prompted him to abandon his public career, and he went on to study law under Aulus Ofilius.

Tubero authored several works on law, as well as an annalistic history of Rome in at least 14 books, covering the period from the city's foundation to his own day. He is known to have used the libri lintei (linen books or rolls) as a source, and the historian Livy cites him as a reference.

Family
Tubero married a daughter of the jurist Servius Sulpicius Rufus, and was father to Quintus Aelius Tubero and Sextus Aelius Catus, consuls in 11 BC and AD 4 respectively. He also had a daughter whose son was the jurist Gaius Cassius Longinus, consul in AD 30.

References

Sources
 Dictionary of Greek and Roman Biography and Mythology, "Tubero, Aelius"
 
 Oxford Classical Dictionary, "Aelius Tubero, Quintus"

1st-century BC historians
1st-century BC Romans
Tubero, Quintus
Ancient Roman jurists